The Montana High School Association (MHSA) is the governing body of high school athletics in the state of Montana. It was founded in 1921 and today consists of 180+ member schools.

Classification
The MHSA divides schools based upon their total enrollment for all activities. These divisions are 779 and up for Class AA, 307-778 for Class A, 108-306 for Class B and 1-107 for Class C. Further divisions may occur geographically, which varies depending on the activity. However, tournaments to crown state champions solely use class divisions.

AA Divisions 

Western AA
 Big Sky High School - Missoula
 Butte High School - Butte
 Capital High School - Helena
 Flathead High School - Kalispell
 Glacier High School - Kalispell
 Helena High School - Helena
 Hellgate High School - Missoula
 Sentinel High School - Missoula

Eastern AA
 Belgrade High School - Belgrade
 Billings Senior High School - Billings
 Billings West High School - Billings
 Bozeman High School - Bozeman
 Charles M. Russell High School - Great Falls
 Gallatin High School - Bozeman
 Great Falls High School - Great Falls
 Skyview High School - Billings

A Divisions 

Northwestern A
 Browning High School - Browning
 Bigfork High School - Bigfork
 Columbia Falls High School - Columbia Falls
 Libby High School - Libby
 Polson High School - Polson
 Ronan High School - Ronan
 Whitefish High School - Whitefish

Southwestern A
 Beaverhead County High School - Dillon
 Butte Central Catholic High School - Butte
 Corvallis High School - Corvallis
 Frenchtown High School - Frenchtown
 Hamilton High School - Hamilton
 Stevensville High School - Stevensville

Northeastern A
 Custer County High School - Miles City
 Dawson High School - Glendive
 Fergus County High School - Lewistown
 Havre High School - Havre
 Sidney High School - Sidney

Southeastern A
 Billings Central Catholic High School - Billings
 East Helena High School - East Helena
 Hardin High School - Hardin
 Laurel High School - Laurel
 Lockwood High School - Lockwood
 Park High School - Livingston

Sanctioned activities
The MHSA oversees all of the following activities of its constituent schools.
 Fall Sports
Cross Country
Boys Football
Golf
Soccer
Girls Volleyball
 Winter Sports
Basketball
Swimming
Wrestling
 Spring Sports
Boys Baseball
Girls Softball
Tennis
Track & Field
 Athletic Events
Spirit Squad
 Non-Athletic Events
Choir
Orchestra
School band
Speech and Debate

Basketball MHSA State Champions

Boys

† Co-Champions

Girls

† Co-Champions

Cross Country MHSA State Champions

Boys

Girls

Football MHSA State Champions 

† Co-Champions

Golf MHSA State Champions

Boys

† Co-Champions

* Beginning in the 2003-04 school year, Class AA and Class A switched golf from a spring sport to a fall sport. Thus all Class AA and Class A championships since then have been awarded in the fall, while all Class B and Class C championships have continued to be awarded in the spring.

Girls

† Co-Champions

* Beginning in the 2003-04 school year, Class AA and Class A switched golf from a spring sport to a fall sport. Thus all Class AA and Class A championships since then have been awarded in the fall, while all Class B and Class C championships have continued to be awarded in the spring.

Soccer MHSA State Champions

Boys

Girls

Softball MHSA State Champions

Swimming MHSA State Champions

Boys

† Co-Champions

Girls

† Co-Champions

Tennis MHSA State Champions

Boys

† Co-Champions

Girls

† Co-Champions

Track and Field MHSA State Champions

Boys

† Co-Champions

Girls

† Co-Champions

Volleyball MHSA State Champions

* Beginning in the 2002-03 school year, girls volleyball switched seasons from winter to fall. Thus there were two girls volleyball champions crowned in the 2002 calendar year per class, one for each separate school year. This coincided with girls basketball switching seasons from fall to winter.

Wrestling MHSA State Champions

Boys 

† Co-Champions

Girls

References

External links
Official site

Education in Montana
High school sports associations in the United States
Sports organizations established in 1921
Sports in Montana
1921 establishments in Montana